Amraiwadi is one of the 182 assembly constituency of Gujarat. It is located in Ahmedabad District. This seat came into existence after 2008 delimitation.

List of segments
This assembly seat represents the following segments

 Ahmedabad City Taluka (Part) – Ahmedabad Municipal Corporation (Part) Ward No. – 32, 33, 41

Members of Legislative Assembly
2019 - Jagdish Patel, Bharatiya Janata Party

Election results

2022

2019 Bypoll

2017

2012

References

External links
 

Assembly constituencies of Gujarat
Ahmedabad district